Fremont Airport  is a public-use airport located two nautical miles (4 km) southwest of the central business district of Fremont, a city in Sandusky County, Ohio, United States. It is privately owned by Fremont Airport LLC.

Facilities and aircraft 
It has two runways: 9/27 is 4,137 by 60 feet (1,261 x 18 m) with an asphalt pavement; 18/36 is 2,238 by 130 feet (682 x 40 m) with a turf surface.

For the 12-month period ending August 16, 2013, the airport had 38,450 aircraft operations, an average of 105 per day: 96% general aviation, 4% air taxi and <1% military. At that time there were 67 aircraft based at this airport: 82% single-engine, 12% multi-engine and 6% ultralight.

References

External links 
 

Airports in Ohio
Transportation in Sandusky County, Ohio
Buildings and structures in Sandusky County, Ohio